Essam Abdel-Azim (born 1 November 1970) is a former football footballer of Egypt national football team.

Club career
Essam spent his professional career in the Egyptian Premier League with Tersana SC, Al-Ittihad Al-Iskandary and Al-Masry.

International career
Essam was a member in Egypt team in 1992 Summer Olympics.

References

External links
 

1970 births
Living people
Egyptian footballers
Egypt international footballers
Sportspeople from Alexandria
Olympic footballers of Egypt
Footballers at the 1992 Summer Olympics
Association football goalkeepers